John Dadigi (born 9 September 1950) is a Nigerian boxer. He competed in the men's bantamweight event at the 1968 Summer Olympics. At the 1968 Summer Olympics, he lost to Horst Rascher of West Germany.

References

1950 births
Living people
Nigerian male boxers
Olympic boxers of Nigeria
Boxers at the 1968 Summer Olympics
Sportspeople from Lagos
Bantamweight boxers
20th-century Nigerian people